Northampton Public Schools is a school district in Northampton, Massachusetts.  As of 2014, the superintendent is John A. Provost.

Schools

High school
 Northampton High School
 Principal: Lori Vaillancourt
 Associate Principal: Kara Sheridan  Celeste Malvezzi

Middle school
 John F. Kennedy Middle School, Florence
 Principal: Desmond Cadwell

Elementary schools
 Bridge Street School, Northampton
 Principal: Beth Choquette 
 Jackson Street School, Northampton
 Principal: Gwen Agna 
 Robert K. Finn Ryan Road Elementary School, Florence
 Principal: Sarah Madden 
 Leeds Elementary School, Leeds
 Principal: Christine Wenz

See also
 List of school districts in Massachusetts

External links
 Northampton Public Schools website
Report card required by the No Child Left Behind Act (PDF)
Northampton High school website

References

School districts in Massachusetts
Northampton, Massachusetts
Education in Hampshire County, Massachusetts